The 1979 All-Big Eight Conference football team consists of American football players chosen by various organizations for All-Big Eight Conference teams for the 1979 NCAA Division I-A football season.  The selectors for the 1979 season included the Associated Press (AP).

Offensive selections

Quarterbacks
 Phil Bradley, Missouri (AP)

Running backs
 Billy Sims, Oklahoma (AP)
 Jarvis Redwine, Nebraska (AP)
 Worley Taylor, Oklahoma State (AP)

Tight ends
 Junior Miller, Nebraska (AP)

Centers
 Paul Tabor, Oklahoma (AP)

Offensive guards
 John Havekosl, Nebraska (AP)
 Reggie Richardson, Oklahoma State (AP)

Offensive tackles
 Stan Brock, Colorado (AP)
 Louis Oubre, Oklahoma (AP)

Wide receivers
 David Verser, Kansas (AP)

Defensive selections

Defensive ends
 Derrie Nelson, Nebraska (AP)
 Rick Antle, Oklahoma State (AP)

Defensive tackles
 Rod Horn, Nebraska (AP)
 John Goodman, Oklahoma (AP)

Middle guards
 Kerry Weinmaster, Nebraska (AP)

Linebackers
 George Cumby, Oklahoma (AP)
 Ricky Young, Oklahoma State (AP)

Defensive backs
 Mark Haynes, Colorado (AP)
 Darrol Ray, Oklahoma (AP)
 Eric Wright, Missouri (AP)

Special teams

Place-kicker
 Dean Sukup, Nebraska (AP)

Punter
 Mike Hubach, Kansas (AP)

Key

AP = Associated Press

See also
 1979 College Football All-America Team

References

All-Big Seven Conference football team
All-Big Eight Conference football teams